Kalinino is a rural locality (a village) in Terebayevskoye Rural Settlement, Nikolsky District, Vologda Oblast, Russia. The population was 195 as of 2002.

Geography 
The distance to Nikolsk is 24 km, to Terebayevo is 7 km. Chelpanovo is the nearest rural locality.

References 

Rural localities in Nikolsky District, Vologda Oblast